WMDB is a Regional Mexican-format AM radio station broadcasting on a frequency of 880 kHz in Nashville, Tennessee. The station's power is 2,500 watts during the daytime hours. The station is currently owned by Mahan Janbakhsh, through licensee TBLC Media #2, LLC.  Nighttime power is reduced to 2 watts to protect the signal of WCBS in New York, New York. WCBS is the dominant Class A signal on 880 AM.

History
WMDB signed on the air in 1983 under the original owner, Reverend Morgan Babb. It was a black-oriented station with urban gospel in the morning, transitioning to secular rhythm & blues in the afternoon. Morgan Babb came up with the station's popular moniker slogan "The Big Mouth", because of WMDB's large daytime signal. Morgan Babb also claimed his secular R&B format was the "rock lite" format, drawing not just black listeners, but many white listeners as well. By 2000, the music format also included Hip Hop.
In May of 2005, Reverend Morgan Babb sold WMDB to Peter Davison of Davidson Media Group, based out of Charlotte, North Carolina, according to FCC Records. The FCC granted the transfer of WMDB's license July 5th, 2005. During this time period, Davidson Media Group purchased AM 1240, (then WNSG) in the Nashville Market. Davidson Media Changed WNSG's call sign to WNVL on September 21, 2005. Shortly afterwards, Davidson Media Group would eventually flip both WMDB and WNVL to Spanish Language Formats.

References

External links

MDB
Radio stations established in 1960
1960 establishments in Tennessee